Elmer Laurence Madarik (July 15, 1922 – February 1974) was an American football running back in the National Football League for the Detroit Lions and Washington Redskins.  He played college football at the University of Detroit Mercy and was drafted in the 18th round of the 1944 NFL Draft.

1922 births
1974 deaths
American football running backs
Detroit Lions players
Washington Redskins players
Sportspeople from Joliet, Illinois
Detroit Titans football players
Players of American football from Illinois